John Gbassay Sessay (born 11 May 1968) is a retired Sierra Leonean international footballer who played as a striker.

Sessay played in the Portuguese Liga for Estrela da Amadora and Vitória Setúbal.

Sessay was a member of the Sierra Leone national football team (the 'Leone Stars') squad at the 1994 African Nations Cup in Tunisia and the 1996 African Nations Cup in South Africa. He scored one of Sierra Leone's two goals as the Leone Stars defeated Burkina Faso in their opening match of the 1996 African Nations Cup.

References

External links

1968 births
Living people
Sierra Leonean footballers
Sierra Leone international footballers
1994 African Cup of Nations players
1996 African Cup of Nations players
C.F. Estrela da Amadora players
Vitória F.C. players
F.C. Paços de Ferreira players
Temne people
S.C. Covilhã players
Sport Benfica e Castelo Branco players
People from Bombali District

Association football forwards